Eden's Trail is a 5 issues Marvel Comics limited series created in 2003 by Chuck Austen and Steve Uy. The story focuses on a young woman named Tila and a man named Latch, who is immortal and seeks a way to rid himself of his immortality. Steve Uy has stated his disdain for the series, as he had little control of the story.

References

2003 comics debuts
Marvel Comics limited series